Omoo: A Narrative of Adventures in the South Seas is the second book by American writer Herman Melville, first published in London in 1847, and a sequel to his first South Sea narrative Typee, also based on the author's experiences in the South Pacific. After leaving the island of Nuku Hiva, the main character ships aboard a whaling vessel that makes its way to Tahiti, after which there is a mutiny and a third of the crew are imprisoned on Tahiti. In 1949, the novel was adapted into the exploitation film Omoo-Omoo, the Shark God.

Background
In the Preface to Omoo, Melville claimed the book was autobiographical, written  "from simple recollection" of some of his experiences in the Pacific in the 1840s and strengthened by his retelling the story many times before family and friends. But scholar Charles Roberts Anderson, working in the late 1930s, discovered that Melville had not simply relied on his memory and went on to reveal a wealth of other sources he drew on in writing the book.

Later, Melville scholar Harrison Hayford made a detailed study of these sources and, in the introduction to a 1969 edition of Omoo, summed up the author's practice, showing that this was a repetition of a process previously used in Typee: "He had altered facts and dates, elaborated events, assimilated foreign materials, invented episodes, and dramatized the printed experiences of others as his own. He had not plagiarized, merely, for he had always rewritten and nearly always improved the passages he appropriated.....first writing out the narrative based on his recollections and invention, then using source books to pad out the chapters he had already written and to supply the stuff of new chapters that he inserted at various points in the manuscript."

Plot
The novel is a sequel to the author's first book, Typee (1846) and takes up where the earlier story leaves off. The un-named narrator has just escaped an “indulgent captivity” among the natives of Nuku Hiva by joining the crew of an Australian whaling ship from Sydney. Soon after coming aboard he meets and forms a friendship with the vessel’s surgeon, a tall thin man known to his crew-mates as “Dr Long Ghost”.

Publication history
The book was published first by John Murray in London on March 30, 1847. In the U.S. a portion was printed on April 24, 1847, in The Literary World, with a complete edition released by the Harper Brothers on May 1 of that year.

Murray included both Typee and Omoo in his Home and Colonial Library which was marketed and sold as a collection throughout the British Empire. In it, Melville was listed together with other well-known writers, an event that turned out to be an important watershed for both his sales and reputation. "Over the decades Melville's presence in the library insured the fame of his first two books with two or three generations of English readers all around the world."

Notes

References

External links

 
 Free typeset PDF ebook of Omoo and other Melville novels optimized for printing, plus extensive Melville reading list

1847 American novels
Novels by Herman Melville
Novels set in Tahiti
Novels republished in the Library of America
American novels adapted into films
Novels set in Oceania
Books about whaling
Nautical novels
Novels set in the 19th century